The 2014–15 season was Udinese Calcio's 35th in Serie A, and their 20th consecutive season in the top-flight. Having missed out on European football for the first time since the 2010–11 season, the club competed domestically in Serie A and in the Coppa Italia, finishing 16th and being eliminated in the round of 16, respectively.

Players

Squad information

Serie A

League table

Results summary

Results by round

Matches

Coppa Italia

Statistics

Appearances and goals

|-
! colspan=14 style="background:#dcdcdc; text-align:center"| Goalkeepers                          

|-
! colspan=14 style="background:#dcdcdc; text-align:center"| Defenders

|-
! colspan=14 style="background:#dcdcdc; text-align:center"| Midfielders

|-
! colspan=14 style="background:#dcdcdc; text-align:center"| Forwards

|-
! colspan=14 style="background:#dcdcdc; text-align:center"| Players transferred out during the season

Goalscorers

Last updated: 31 May 2015

References

Udinese Calcio seasons
Udinese